Özyürek is a Turkish surname formed by the combination of the Turkish words öz ("gist; kernel") and yürek ("heart") and may refer to:
 Hande Özyürek (born 1976), Turkish violinist
 Mehmet Özyürek (born 1949), Turkish physical attribute record holder

References

Turkish-language surnames